The Wurst of P. D. Q. Bach is a collection of works by Peter Schickele under his comic pseudonym of P. D. Q. Bach originally recorded on the Vanguard Records label by the composer. It includes "lowlights" from four different Vanguard albums: Peter Schickele Presents an Evening with P. D. Q. Bach (1807–1742)?, An Hysteric Return: P.D.Q. Bach at Carnegie Hall, Report from Hoople: P. D. Q. Bach on the Air, and P. D. Q. Bach's half-act opera The Stoned Guest. Wurst is the German word for sausage, with the album cover photograph set in a sausage shop.

Performers
Professor Peter Schickele, hardart, wine bottle, conductor
Chamber Orchestra under the direction of Jorge Mester
The Royal P. D. Q. Bach Festival Orchestra, Jorge Mester, conductor
The Orchestra of the University of Southern North Dakota at Hoople Heavy Opera Company under the direction of John Nelson
Marlene Kleinman, mezzanine-soprano
Lorna Haywood, off-coloratura
John Ferrante, bargain counter tenor
William Woolf, bass
Bernice,  (Dog)
Will Jordan as Milton Host
Bill Macy as Paul Henry Lung
The Okay Chorale, John Nelson, director
I Virtuosi di Hoople
Amateur Musica Antiqua of Hoople
Robert Dennis, announcer and callioper
Ralph Froelich, French horn
Leonid Hambro, harpsichord
Seymour Platt, trumpet mouthpiece

Track listing

Disc one

Concerto for Horn and Hardart, S. 27
Allegro con brillo 
Tema con variazione
Menuetto con Panna e Zucchero
Cantata: Iphigenia in Brooklyn, S. 53162
Aria: "As Hyperion across the flaming sky"
Recitative: "And lo, she found herself within a market"
Ground: "Dying, and yet in death alive"
Recitative: "And in a vision, Iphigenia saw her brother, Orestes"
Aria: "Running knows"
New Horizons in Music Appreciation: Beethoven's Fifth Symphony
Schleptet in E-flat major
Molto Larghissimo – Allegro Boffo
Menuetto con Brio ma senza Trio
Adagio Saccharino
Yehudi Menuetto
Presto Hey Nonny Nonnio
What's My Melodic Line?
Madrigal "My bonnie lass she smelleth" from The Triumphs of Thusnelda

Disc two

"Unbegun" Symphony (Schickele)
IV. Andante – Allegro
Half-act opera: The Stoned Guest, excerpts
Introduction
Overture
Recitative and aria: "Now is the season"
Trio: "I'm sure I'd be"
Intermission feature: Opera Whiz
Plot synopsis
Finale: "O saviour"
Fugue in C minor, from the "Toot" Suite for calliope four hands, S. 212° 
Oratorio: The Seasonings, S. 1½ tsp.
Chorus: "Tarragon of virtue is full"
Recitative: "And there were in the same country"
Duet: "Bide thy thyme"
Recitative: "Then asked he"
Chorale: "By the leeks of Babylon, There we sat down, yea, we wept"
Aria: "Open sesame seeds"
Recitative: "So saying"
Duet: "Summer is a cumin seed"
Chorus with soloists: "To curry favor, favor curry"

Sources
 The Wurst of P. D. Q. Bach (two disc set), schickele.com

P. D. Q. Bach compilation albums
1971 compilation albums
1970s comedy albums
Vanguard Records compilation albums